Snowden Hall is a  historic house located on the grounds of the Patuxent Wildlife Research Center, outside Laurel in Prince George's County, Maryland, United States. It stands on open rolling ground approximately -mile west of the Patuxent River.

History
Snowden Hall is a two-story Georgian brick house and was the home of three generations of the Snowden family.  The  parcel of land on which it stands was the nucleus of the Snowden family plantation. The family were slave holders and more than a hundred slaves were known to gather at Snowden Hall to listen to Bible readings on Sunday mornings.

The original Snowden Hall was constructed by Richard Snowden in the 18th century. The site is a portion of a  land grant from King Charles II. Sometime between 1812 and 1816 the Hall burned and was rebuilt as "Rose Cottage." Rose Cottage was subsequently raised to a full two stories in the 1850s. Former slave quarters and a large barn were on the east side of the property into the 1930s.

The property was purchased and renovated for government use in 1936, first as apartments and later as an office building.  The low flanking wings were built at that time using bricks from the recently purchased pre-Civil War Duvall plantation house "Gladswood" on the southern section of the research center lands.

See also
Patuxent Research Refuge

References

External links

Houses completed in the 19th century
Plantation houses in Maryland
Houses in Prince George's County, Maryland
Historic American Buildings Survey in Maryland
Buildings and structures in Laurel, Maryland
Georgian architecture in Maryland